Ali S. Raja is an American emergency physician and researcher. He is the Executive Vice Chair of the Department of Emergency Medicine at Massachusetts General Hospital, and a professor at Harvard Medical School.

Early life and education
Raja was born in Pakistan and grew up in Houston, where he attended Rice University, graduating in 1999. He earned MD and MBA degrees at the Duke University School of Medicine and the Duke Fuqua School of Business in 2004, and a Master of Public Health from the Harvard T.H. Chan School of Public Health in 2010.

Career and research
Raja trained as a resident in emergency medicine at the University of Cincinnati, and then began his career as a faculty member at Harvard Medical School in 2008.  He completed a research fellowship at Brigham and Women's Hospital while also working as an attending physician in the Department of Emergency Medicine. During this time, Raja also served as a flight surgeon and critical care air transport team commander for the US Air Force Reserve. In 2014, Raja moved to his current role at MGH, where he has been practicing since.

Raja’s research focuses on the appropriate use of emergency department resources.

References 

Living people
Physicians of Massachusetts General Hospital
Harvard Medical School faculty
American emergency physicians
Harvard School of Public Health alumni
Duke University School of Medicine alumni
Fuqua School of Business alumni
Year of birth missing (living people)
21st-century American physicians